This is a list of the Brazil national football team's competitive records and statistics.

Honours

Senior team

Major competitions
 FIFA World Cup:
 Winners (5): 1958, 1962, 1970, 1994, 2002
 Runners-up (2): 1950, 1998
 Third place (2): 1938, 1978
 Fourth place (2): 1974, 2014
 South American Championship / Copa América:
 Winners (9): 1919, 1922, 1949, 1989, 1997, 1999, 2004, 2007, 2019
 Runners-up (12): 1921, 1925, 1937, 1945, 1946, 1953, 1957, 1959 (Argentina), 1983, 1991, 1995, 2021
 Third place (7): 1916, 1917, 1920, 1942, 1959 (Ecuador), 1975, 1979
 Fourth place (3): 1923, 1956, 1963
 FIFA Confederations Cup:
 Winners (4): 1997, 2005, 2009, 2013
 Runners-up: 1999
 Fourth place: 2001
 Panamerican Championship:
 Winners (2): 1952, 1956
 Runners-up: 1960
 CONCACAF Gold Cup:
 Runners-up (2): 1996, 2003
 Third place: 1998

Awards 
 FIFA Team of the Year:
 Winners (12): 1994, 1995, 1996, 1997, 1998, 1999, 2000, 2002, 2003, 2004, 2005, 2006
 World Soccer Team of the Year
Winners (2): 1982, 2002
 FIFA World Cup Fair Play Trophy:
 Winners (4): 1982, 1986, 1994, 2006
 FIFA Confederations Cup Fair Play Trophy:
 Winners (2): 1999, 2009
 Copa América Fair Play Trophy:
 Winners (1) : 2019

South-American National Teams Tournaments 

 Roca Cup / Superclásico de las Américas (vs ):
 Winners (12): 1914, 1922, 1945, 1957, 1960, 1963, 1971 (shared), 1976, 2011, 2012, 2014, 2018
 Copa Confraternidad (vs ):
 Winners: 1923
 Copa 50imo Aniversario de Clarín (vs ):
 Winners: 1995
 Copa Río Branco (vs ):
 Winners (7): 1931, 1932, 1947, 1950, 1967 (shared), 1968, 1976
 Copa Rodrigues Alves (vs ):
 Winners (2): 1922, 1923
 Taça Oswaldo Cruz (vs ):
Winners (8): 1950, 1955, 1956, 1958, 1961, 1962, 1968, 1976
 Copa Bernardo O'Higgins (vs ):
 Winners (4): 1955, 1959, 1961, 1966 (shared)
  Copa Teixeira (vs ):
 Winners: 1990 (shared)
 Taça Jorge Chavéz / Santos Dumont (vs ):
 Winners: 1968

Friendlies 
 Taça Interventor Federal (vs EC Bahia):
 Winners: 1934
 Taça Dois de Julho (vs Bahia XI):
 Winners: 1934
 Copa Emílio Garrastazú Médici (vs ):
 Winners: 1970
 Taça Independência:
 Winners: 1972
 Taça do Atlântico:
 Winners (3): 1956, 1970, 1976
 U.S.A. Bicentennial Cup Tournament:
 Winners: 1976
 Taça Centenário Jornal O Fluminense (vs Rio de Janeiro XI):
 Winners: 1978
 Saudi Crown Prince Trophy (vs Al Ahli Saudi FC):
 Winners: 1978
 Rous Cup:
 Winners: 1987
 Australia Bicentenary Gold Cup:
 Winners: 1988
 Amistad Cup:
 Winners: 1992
 Umbro Cup:
 Winners: 1995
 Nelson Mandela Challenge:
 Winners: 1996
 Lunar New Year Cup:
 Winners: 2005
 Kirin Challenge Cup:
 Winners: 2022

Olympic and Pan American Team
 Summer Olympics:
 Gold medalists (2): 2016, 2020
 Silver medalists (3): 1984, 1988, 2012
 Bronze medalists (2): 1996, 2008
 Fourth place: 1976
 Pan American Games:
 Gold medalists (4): 1963, 1975 (shared), 1979, 1987
 Silver medalists (3): 1959, 1983, 2003
 Bronze medalists (1): 2015
 CONMEBOL Pre-Olympic Tournament:
 Winners (7): 1968, 1971, 1976, 1984, 1987, 1996, 2000
 Runners-up (2): 1964, 2020
 Third place (2): 1960, 2004

Individual records

Player records

Players in bold are still active with Brazil.

Most capped players

Top goalscorers

Youngest goalscorer

Oldest goalscorer

Most goals scored in a single match

First goal scored
 Oswaldo Gomes vs.  Exeter City FC, 21 July 1914 (unofficial game)

Manager records

Manager list

Most manager appearances 

Includes only official matches. In bold the current manager.

Managers at the FIFA World Cup 

In bold, edition champions

Managers at the South American Championship and Copa América 

In bold, edition champions

Managers at the FIFA Confederations Cup 

In bold, edition champions

Managers at the Panamerican Championship 

In bold, edition champions

Managers at the CONCACAF Gold Cup 

In bold, edition champions

Managers at the Olympic Games 

In bold, edition champions

Managers at the Pan American Games 

In bold, edition champions

Team records
 Biggest victories

 Most consecutive matches undefeated

 Most consecutives wins
 14 (1997)

FIFA World Ranking history

Source:

Performance summary

 First place 12 times (1994, 1995, 1996, 1997, 1998, 1999, 2000, 2002, 2003, 2004, 2005, 2006, 2022)
 Second place 5 times (2007, 2009, 2016, 2017, 2021)
 Third place 5 times (1993, 2001, 2018, 2019, 2020)
 CONMEBOL best placed team  20 times (1993, 1994, 1995, 1996, 1997, 1998, 1999, 2000, 2002, 2004, 2005, 2006, 2008, 2009, 2010, 2017, 2018, 2019, 2020, 2021, 2022)
 Top 3 23 of 30
 Top 10 28 of 30

World Football Elo Ratings history

Source:

Performance summary

 First place 26 times (1958, 1959, 1960, 1961, 1962, 1965, 1970, 1971, 1973, 1978, 1982, 1994, 1995, 1997, 1999, 2002, 2005, 2006, 2007, 2009, 2013, 2016, 2017, 2018, 2020, 2021)
 Second place 19 times (1950, 1951, 1969, 1972, 1976, 1979, 1980, 1981, 1986, 1988, 1989, 1992, 1996, 1998, 2000, 2012, 2015, 2019, 2022)
 Third place 11 times (1945, 1946, 1952, 1955, 1956, 1968, 1974, 1977, 2008, 2010, 2014)
 Top 3 56 of 109
 Top 10 105 of 109

Competition records

FIFA World Cup record

*Denotes draws include knockout matches decided on penalty kicks.
**Gold background color indicates that the tournament was won. Red border color indicates tournament was held on home soil.
***Right arrow (→) means an actual tournament status.

FIFA Confederations Cup record

*Denotes draws include knockout matches decided on penalty kicks.
**Gold background color indicates that the tournament was won. Red border color indicates tournament was held on home soil.
***Right arrow (→) means an actual tournament status.

Copa América and South American Championship record
From 1916 to 1967 the tournament was called South American Football Championship and was played in a single group with teams playing each other. Extra matches were played if two teams finish tied in points as top of the group. The competition was renamed Copa América from 1975 onwards and the format changed to a group stage and a knockout stage tournament.

*Denotes draws include knockout matches decided on penalty kicks.
**Gold background color indicates that the tournament was won.***Red border color indicates tournament was held on home soil.Panamerican Championship record

The Panamerican Championship was an international  football tournament held by the Panamerican Football Confederation every four years from 1952 through 1960. Since the Americas' premier tournament, Copa América, was restricted to South American teams, the Panamerican Championship was an attempt to create an Americas-wide championship.*Denotes draws include knockout matches decided on penalty kicks.**Gold background color indicates that the tournament was won. Red border color indicates tournament was held on home soil.***Right arrow (→) means an actual tournament status.CONCACAF Gold Cup record
Brazil has been invited to participate in 3 editions of the CONCACAF Gold Cup.*Denotes draws include knockout matches decided on penalty kicks.**Gold background color indicates that the tournament was won. Red border color indicates tournament was held on home soil.***Right arrow (→) means an actual tournament status.Olympics record
Football at the Summer Olympics has been an under-23 tournament since 1992.*Denotes draws include knockout matches decided on penalty kicks.**Gold background color indicates that the tournament was won. Red border color indicates tournament was held on home soil.***Right arrow (→) means an actual tournament status.Pan American Games record*Denotes draws include knockout matches decided on penalty kicks.**Gold background color indicates that the tournament was won. Red border color indicates tournament was held on home soil.***Right arrow (→) means an actual tournament status.''

Head-to-head record

Below is a result summary of all matches Brazil have played against FIFA recognized teams. Updated to 9 December 2022.

Matches against non-FIFA and clubs

Matches in major tournaments

FIFA World Cup

Uruguay 1930

Italy 1934

France 1938

Brazil 1950

Switzerland 1954

Sweden 1958

Chile 1962

England 1966

Mexico 1970

West Germany 1974

Argentina 1978

Spain 1982

Mexico 1986

Italy 1990

United States 1994

France 1998

Korea/Japan 2002

Germany 2006

South Africa 2010

Brazil 2014

Russia 2018

Qatar 2022

FIFA Confederations Cup

Saudi Arabia 1997

Mexico 1999

Korea/Japan 2001

France 2003

Germany 2005

South Africa 2009

Brazil 2013

Copa América/South American Championship

Argentina 1916

Uruguay 1917

Brazil 1919

Chile 1920

Argentina 1921

Brazil 1922

Uruguay 1923

Argentina 1925

Argentina 1937

Uruguay 1942

Chile 1945

Argentina 1946

Brazil 1949

Peru 1953

Uruguay 1956

Peru 1957

Argentina 1959

Ecuador 1959

Bolivia 1963

1975

1979

1983

Argentina 1987

Brazil 1989

Chile 1991

Ecuador 1993

Uruguay 1995

Bolivia 1997

Paraguay 1999

Colombia 2001

Peru 2004

Venezuela 2007

Argentina 2011

Chile 2015

United States 2016

Brazil 2019

Brazil 2021

Panamerican Championship

Chile 1952

Mexico 1956

Costa Rica 1960

CONCACAF Gold Cup

United States 1996

United States 1998

United States/Mexico 2003

Football at the Summer Olympics

Helsinki 1952

Rome 1960

Tokyo 1964

Mexico City 1968

Munich 1972

Montreal 1976

Los Angeles 1984

Seoul 1988

Atlanta 1996

Sydney 2000

Beijing 2008

London 2012

Rio de Janeiro 2016

Tokyo 2020

Football at the Pan-American Games

Chicago 1959

São Paulo 1963

Mexico City 1975

San Juan 1979

Caracas 1983

Indianapolis 1987

Mar del Plata 1995

Santo Domingo 2003

Rio de Janeiro 2007

Guadalajara 2011

Toronto 2015

References

Brazil at the FIFA World Cup
Brazil at the Copa América
Brazil at the Men's Olympic Football Tournament
Brazil national football team records and statistics
National association football team records and statistics